Ohuchi Dam  is a gravity dam located in Kagawa Prefecture in Japan. The dam is used for flood control and water supply. The catchment area of the dam is 3.2 km2. The dam impounds about 13  ha of land when full and can store 1000 thousand cubic meters of water. The construction of the dam was started on 1963 and completed in 1966.

See also
List of dams in Japan

References

Dams in Kagawa Prefecture